Edmund Bartlett is a Jamaican politician who is Member of Parliament for Saint James East Central. He is current Minister of Tourism, having succeeded Wykeham McNeill when the Jamaica Labour Party won the 2016 general elections.
Bartlett, a native of the parish of Westmoreland, Jamaica, was educated at St Elizabeth Technical High School, where he was Head Boy, and the University of the West Indies, Mona, where he studied sociology.
He was first elected to the House of Representatives in 2002 and he has served as a minister in Jamaica Labour Party administration since before then. He became the youngest serving  member of parliament in 1980. 

His wife is Carmen A. Bartlett. They had two children. Their daughter, Lisa, died. Their son Edmund has a family of four: a wife Sarah, son William, and daughter Leia.

References

External links 
 Hon. Edmund Bartlett – Minister of Tourism 
 JLP Candidates and MP's: Edmund Bartlett
 South Florida Times
 Journey begins - Portia sworn in - Lead Stories - Jamaica Gleaner - Friday | January 6, 2012

Year of birth missing (living people)
Living people
Tourism ministers of Jamaica
Tourism ministers
Members of the 14th Parliament of Jamaica
University of the West Indies alumni